Two local elections were held in South Korea in 1991. District, city and county councilor elections were held on 26 March 1991, while metropolitan city and provincial councilor elections were held on 20 June 1991.

District, city and county councilor elections 
Elections for 4,304 district, city and county councilors were held on 26 March 1991. 13,238,308 voters, or 55% of the 24,067,144 registered voters, voted in the elections.
A re-election was held on 30 April 1991 in a constituency in Seonju-dong, Gumi, North Gyeongsang after Kim Pan-su, a candidate who was set to be elected without a vote, withdrew on 25 March following his arrest for paying the only opposing candidate in the constituency to withdraw from the election.

Metropolitan city and provincial councilor elections 
Elections for 866 metropolitan city and provincial councilors were held on 20 June 1991.16,533,934 voters, or 58.9% of the 28,083,024 registered voters, voted in the elections.

Results summary

Results per region

References 

1991 elections in South Korea
1991